The 2016 Euro Beach Soccer League (EBSL) was the 19th edition of the annual, premier European competition in beach soccer contested between men's national teams, in a league and play-off format, taking place between 1 July and 28 August 2016.

This season a record 26 teams took part in two divisions. Twelve teams continued to contest Division A as in recent seasons, consisting of the top eleven finishers from the previous year plus Romania who were promoted. Whilst Division B was expanded to accommodate fourteen nations; those who did not gain promotion from the previous season, returning and debuting nations, plus Hungary who were relegated from the top tier.

This season there were three stages of fixtures. Each team from Division A played in two stages whilst each team from Division B played in one, earning points for the overall league tables.

At the end of the stages, according to the league tables, the eight best teams in Division A advanced to the Superfinal to compete to become the winners of this year's EBSL. Meanwhile, the top seven teams in Division B and the team ranked bottom of Division A played in the Promotion final to try to earn a spot in Division A next year.

Azerbaijan were promoted to Division A for the first time after beating Hungary in the Promotion Final who were looking to be promoted straight back up in their first season after relegation. Romania finished last in Division A and failed to defend their place in the Promotion Final and were therefore subsequently relegated straight back down to Division B having been promoted in 2015.

The Ukraine won the league after a strong performance in the Superfinal, despite only finishing sixth after the preliminary three stages were complete, claiming their first EBSL title, defeating defending champions Portugal in the final in a repeat of the previous season's title deciding match.

Calendar and Locations

Teams

The numbers in brackets show the European ranking of each team prior to the start of the league, out of 33 teams.

Division A

  (1st)
  (2nd)
  (3rd)
  (4th)
  (5th)
  (6th)
  (8th)
  (9th)
  (11th)
  (12th)
  (13th)
  (15th)

Division B

  (7th)
  (10th)
  (14th)
  (16th)
  (17th)
  (18th)
  (19th)
  (21st)
  (22nd)
  (23rd)
  (24th)
  (30th)
 1 (31st)
 1 (n/a)

Notes:
1. Teams making their debut

Stage 1 (Moscow, 1–3 July) 
Matches are listed as local time in Moscow, (UTC+3)

All matches took place at Yantar Stadium in the district of Strogino.

Division A

Group 1

Group 2

Awards

Division B

Stage 2 (Sanxenxo, 8–10 July) 
Matches are listed as local time in Sanxenxo, (UTC+2)

All matches took place at a purpose built stadium on Silgar Beach.

Division A

Group 1

Group 2

Awards

Division B

Group 1

Group 2

Stage 3 (Siófok, 12–14 August) 
Matches are listed as local time in Siófok, (UTC+2)

All matches took place at Mlsz Beach Arena.

Division A

Group 1

Group 2

Awards

Division B

League Tables 

At stage completion

Ranking & tie-breaking criteria: Division A – 1. Points earned 2. Goal difference 3. Goals scored | Division B – 1. Highest group placement 2. Points earned 3. Goal difference 4. Goals scored 5. Results against 4th place team

Division A

Division B

Note: Since one group in Division B consisted of just three teams, for the teams who finished in 1st, 2nd or 3rd in a group of four, their results against the 4th placed team in their groups have been discounted.
Team group placement:  1st place /  2nd place /  3rd place /  4th place

(Q) – Qualified to Promotion Final as group winner(q) – Qualified Promotion Final as best non-winners

Promotion Final (Catania, 25–28 August)

Qualified teams
Teams in bold qualified as group winners. The team in italics attempted to retain their position in Division A, having finished bottom of the table.

 (Last place, Division A)

Group stage
Matches are listed as local time in Catania, (UTC+2)

All matches took place at the DomusBet Arena Beach Stadium with a capacity of 2 000.

Group 1

Group 2

Play-offs

Seventh place play-off

Fifth place play-off

Third place play-off

Promotion play-off final

Final standings

Italics: team from Division A

Superfinal (Catania, 25–28 August)

Qualified Teams

Group stage
Matches are listed as local time in Catania, (UTC+2)

All matches took place at the DomusBet Arena Beach Stadium with a capacity of 2 000.

Group 1

Group 2

Play-offs

Seventh place play-off

Fifth place play-off

Third place play-off

Superfinal match

Awards

Final standings

References

External links 
 Beach Soccer Worldwide
 EBSL, 2016
 Stage 1, Day 1 report 
 Stage 1, Day 2 report

Euro Beach Soccer League
2016 in beach soccer